Judah ben Solomon may refer to:

 Judah ben Solomon Canpanton (14th century), philosopher
 Judah ben Solomon ha-Kohen (c. 1215–c. 1274),  Spanish philosopher, astronomer, and mathematician
 Judah ben Solomon Harizi (c. 1165–1225), Spanish rabbi, translator, and poet
 Judah ben Solomon Taitazak (15th and 16th centuries), Ottoman Talmudist
 Nathan Judah ben Solomon (14th century), Provençal physician and scholar

See also
 Solomon ben Judah (disambiguation)